Manus Ek Mati (Marathi: माणूस एक माती) is a Marathi film released theatrically on 24 March 2017. This film is presented by Shivam Saheli Pariwar and is produced under the banner Shivam Entertainment India Ltd by Sharda Vijaykumar Kharat. The film is directed by Suresh Shankar Zade. Vijaykumar Kharat and Dilip Nimbekar are the co-producers and Deva Pande is the executive producer of this film. .

Cast 
 Siddharth Jadhav
 Ruchita Jadhav 
 Ganesh Yadav 
 Swapnil Rajshekhar 
 Vilas Ujawane 
 Harsha Gupte 
 Heena Panchal as an item number

Soundtrack

Production 
Manus Ek Mati is set on the backdrop of today's busy lifestyle which makes people forget their relationship with others. In this film Siddharth Jadhav will be seen in a new look. Siddharth is playing an old man in this film. His character will be a person who does something visionary or important in the story of this film. Actress Smita Gondkar will be seen in a lavani song while Indra Kumar, Heena Panchal and Milind Gunaji will be seen in item song.

The film's music is directed by Mr. Prashant Hedaoo and film's Background score is done by Mr. Salil Amrute. The poster of this film was launched in Mumbai.

References

External links 
 

2017 films
Indian drama films
2010s Marathi-language films